Jayezan District is a district (bakhsh) in Omidiyeh County, Khuzestan Province, Iran. At the 2006 census, its population was 15,158, in 3,110 families.  The district has one city: Jayezan. The district has two rural districts (dehestan): Jayezan Rural District and Julaki Rural District.

References 

Omidiyeh County
Districts of Khuzestan Province